The 1986 Proposition 63, titled Official State Language, was a proposition in the state of California on the November 4, 1986 ballot. The ballot initiative created Article III, Section 6 of the California Constitution and made English the official language of the state. The measure passed by a 74% margin, (the largest margin for any proposition).  The amendment:

See also
List of California ballot propositions 1980-1989
1998 California Proposition 227
2016 California Proposition 58
Languages of the United States
Modern English

References

Notes

Works cited

External links 
 English-only law likely would go unenforced 
 Proposition 63: The California English Language Amendment
 California Constitution: Article III, Section 6

1986 California ballot propositions
Language policy in the United States